Saša Popin (born 28 October 1989) is a Serbian footballer who plays for Vuteks-Sloga.

Career
Popin was born in Bačka Topola, SR Serbia, back then still within Yugoslavia. After playing for numerous local clubs, he also played for FK Turnovo, FK Novi Sad, FK Mladost Apatin, OFC Sliven 2000, FK ČSK Čelarevo and FK Novi Pazar. In the 2012/2013 season, he moved to FK Novi Pazar and played in Serbian SuperLiga. In 2012, he made his debut in Serbian SuperLiga playing against FK Radnički 1923.

On 31 August 2019, Popin joined Cypriot club Ermis Aradippou FC.

Honours
Pandurii
Liga I: runner-up 2013

References

External links
 
 http://www.liga-live-mobil.de/en/sasa-popin/erfolge/spieler_85077.html
 Saša Popin at Footballdatabase

1989 births
Living people
People from Bačka Topola
Serbian footballers
Association football forwards
OFC Sliven 2000 players
FK Novi Pazar players
RFK Novi Sad 1921 players
FK Veternik players
FK Mladost Apatin players
CS Pandurii Târgu Jiu players
AFC Săgeata Năvodari players
Lombard-Pápa TFC footballers
Szombathelyi Haladás footballers
FC Nitra players
ŠKF Sereď players
Zalaegerszegi TE players
Szeged-Csanád Grosics Akadémia footballers
Ermis Aradippou FC players
First Professional Football League (Bulgaria) players
Serbian SuperLiga players
Liga I players
Nemzeti Bajnokság I players
2. Liga (Slovakia) players
Serbian expatriate footballers
Expatriate footballers in Bulgaria
Expatriate footballers in Romania
Expatriate footballers in Hungary
Expatriate footballers in Slovakia
Expatriate footballers in Cyprus
Serbian expatriate sportspeople in Bulgaria
Serbian expatriate sportspeople in Romania
Serbian expatriate sportspeople in Hungary
Serbian expatriate sportspeople in Slovakia
Serbian expatriate sportspeople in Cyprus